The 22863 / 64 Howrah–SMVT Bengaluru AC Superfast Express is a Superfast Express express train of the AC Express series belonging to Indian Railways – South Eastern Railway zone that runs between  and Sir M. Visvesvaraya Terminal, Bengaluru  in India.

It operates as train number 22863 from Howrah Junction to Yesvantpur Junction and as train number 22864 in the reverse direction, serving the states of West Bengal, Odisha, Andhra Pradesh, Tamil Nadu & Karnataka.

Coaches

The 22863 / 64 Howrah Junction – Sir M. Visvesvaraya Terminal AC Superfast Express has 10 AC 3 tier, 3 AC 2 Tier, 1 First Class AC Coach & 2 End on Generator coaches. It carries a pantry car .

As is customary with most train services in India, coach composition may be amended at the discretion of Indian Railways depending on demand.

 EOG consists of Luggage and Generator coach
 B consists of AC 3 Tier coach
 PC consists of Pantry car coach
 A consists of AC 2 Tier coach
 H consists of First Class AC coach

Service

As the average speed of the train is above , as per Indian Railways rules, its fare includes a Superfast surcharge.

Routeing

The 22863 / 64 Howrah–SMVT Bengaluru AC Superfast Express runs from

Traction

As the route is electrified, a Santragachi Loco Shed WAP-4 powers the train up to its destination.

Operation

22863 Howrah Junction–SMVT Bengaluru AC Superfast Express leaves Howrah Junction every Monday & arriving Yesvantpur Junction on next day.
22864 SMVT Bengaluru–Howrah Junction AC Superfast Express leaves Yesvantpur Junction every Wednesday & arriving Howrah Junction on next day.

References

External links
22863 AC Express at India Rail Info
22864 AC Express at India Rail Info

Trains from Howrah Junction railway station
Transport in Bangalore
Rail transport in Howrah
AC Express (Indian Railways) trains
Rail transport in West Bengal
Rail transport in Odisha
Rail transport in Andhra Pradesh
Rail transport in Tamil Nadu
Rail transport in Karnataka